Hodges University is a private university in Fort Myers, Florida. Founded in 1990 as International College, it was renamed Hodges University in 2007 in recognition of a $12 million donation from local residents Earl and Thelma Hodges. The Hodges University campus in Naples, Florida closed in 2021, with classes and operations consolidated to Fort Myers.

Academics
Hodges offers 11 associate degree programs, 14 bachelor's degree programs, six master's degree programs and several certificate programs. The university also facilitates a comprehensive English as a Second Language (ESL) program. In addition to in-person classes in Fort Myers, Hodges offers many courses online and in an accelerated 4-week format.

Hodges University also operates the Frances Pew Hayes Center for Lifelong Learning, the Dr. Peter Thomas Veterans Services Center and Center for Diversity, Inclusion and Cultural Competency.

Since its 1990 inception, Hodges University has conferred more than 14,000 degrees.

The university is organized into five colleges:
Fisher School of Technology
Johnson School of Business
Nichols School of Professional Studies
School of Health Sciences
School of General Studies

Accreditation 
The university is accredited by the Southern Association of Colleges and Schools Commission on Colleges to award associate, bachelor's and master's degrees. 

Eight degree programs within the Johnson School of Business are accredited through the International Accreditation Council for Business Education. The Master of Science in clinical mental health counseling degree program is accredited by the Council for Accreditation of Counseling and Related Educational Programs. The Associate in Science in physical therapist assistant (PTA) is accredited through the Commission on Accreditation in Physical Therapy Education.The Bachelor of Science in nursing (BSN) program is accredited by the Accreditation Commission for Education in Nursing ACEN.

Library
The Terry P. McMahan Library serves Hodges University faculty, staff, students and alumni. Since 2003, the library has participated in the Federal Depository Library Program. Hodges is one of two federal depository libraries in Southwest Florida.

Students 
 Enrollment – 1170 (Fall 2019)
 Full-time – 60%; Part-time – 40%
 Average Age: 33 (17% of students are 23 years old or younger, 43% of students are between the ages of 24-34, 27.5% of students are between the ages of 35-45, and 11.8% of students are 46 years old or older.)
 Female – 66%; Male – 34%
 45% Hispanic, 14% African American, 34% White/non-Hispanic, and 6% other minorities.

References

External links
 Official website

Private universities and colleges in Florida
Educational institutions established in 1990
Education in Lee County, Florida
Education in Collier County, Florida
Universities and colleges accredited by the Southern Association of Colleges and Schools
1990 establishments in Florida